A Dictionary of Americanisms on Historical Principles is a dictionary of English words and phrases that originated in the United States. The two-volume dictionary was edited by Mitford M. Mathews and was published in 1951 by University of Chicago Press.

The work should not be confused with John Russell Bartlett's Dictionary of Americanisms.

References

External links

1951 non-fiction books
English dictionaries
Works about American English